Danny Johnson (born November 17, 1995) is an American football cornerback for the Washington Commanders of the National Football League (NFL). He played college football at Southern and was signed by Washington as an undrafted free agent in 2018.

College career
He played college football at Southern University and was invited to the 2018 Senior Bowl, becoming the first player from that school to receive an invitation in two decades.

Professional career

Johnson participated in the 2018 NFL Combine. Johnson went unselected in the 2018 NFL Draft, but signed an undrafted free agent contract with the Washington Redskins soon after. He made his NFL debut in the Redskins' season opener against the Arizona Cardinals. He had a 24-yard kick return in the 24–6 victory. He was placed on injured reserve on December 19, 2018.

Johnson was placed on the physically unable to perform list to start the 2019 season while recovering from injury. He was activated on December 10, 2019. He started two games before being placed on injured reserve on December 24, 2019. He re-signed with the team on March 23, 2021, but was waived on August 31, 2021, and re-signed to the practice squad the following day. Johnson was signed to the active roster on October 5, 2021.

Johnson re-signed with the team on March 23, 2022. He was waived on August 30, 2022, and signed to the practice squad the following day. He was promoted back to the active roster on October 25, 2022. In Week 9 of the 2022 season, Johnson recorded his first career interception against the Minnesota Vikings off a pass deflected by Benjamin St-Juste in the end zone.

Johnson signed a two-year contract extension with the Commanders on March 16, 2023.

References

External links
 Washington Commanders bio

1995 births
Living people
Players of American football from Louisiana
People from East Feliciana Parish, Louisiana
American football cornerbacks
Southern Jaguars football players
Washington Redskins players
Washington Football Team players
Washington Commanders players